is a Japanese singer and actress.  She was known as the "Banana Boat Girl" after she recorded a bi-lingual cover of the "Banana Boat Song"

References

External links
 

Japanese actresses
1938 births
Living people